Charles Elbert Whelan (1862–1928) was Mayor of Madison, Wisconsin, from 1898 to 1899.

References

Mayors of Madison, Wisconsin
1862 births
1928 deaths